Serge Pauwels (born 21 November 1983) is a Belgian former professional road racing cyclist, who rode professionally between 2006 and 2020, for , the , , ,  and the .

Cycling career
Born in Lier, Flanders, Pauwels' career kicked off in 2004 in the youth team of the Netherlands ProTeam . He also rode for their Continental team in 2004 and 2005. Pauwels won the overall mountain ranking in the 2007 Tour Down Under and was second in the sixth stage of the 2006 Tour de l'Avenir in France.

Major results

2003
 5th Overall Grand Prix Guillaume Tell
 10th Ronde van Vlaanderen U23
2004
 9th Overall Tour des Pyrénées
2005
 5th Liège–Bastogne–Liège U23
 7th Overall Gran Premio Internacional del Oeste RTP
2006
 4th Overall Tour de l'Avenir
 8th Grand Prix de Wallonie
2007
 1st  Mountains classification Tour Down Under
2008
 8th Overall Tour de Wallonie
 9th Internationale Wielertrofee Jong Maar Moedig
2012
 9th Overall Tour de l'Ain
1st Stage 2b (TTT)
2015
 2nd International Road Cycling Challenge
 5th Overall Tour of Turkey
2016
 8th Trofeo Serra de Tramuntana
 9th Overall Tour de Yorkshire
2017
 1st  Overall Tour de Yorkshire
1st Stage 3
2018
 3rd Overall Tour de Yorkshire
 8th Overall Volta ao Algarve

Grand Tour general classification results timeline

References

External links

Belgian male cyclists
Living people
1983 births
People from Lier, Belgium
Cyclists from Antwerp Province
Olympic cyclists of Belgium
Cyclists at the 2016 Summer Olympics